Balmirmer is a hamlet in the council area  of Angus, Scotland.
The hamlet is the location of West Balmirmer Farm, the birthplace of Margaret Fairlie, the first woman to hold a university chair in Scotland.

Notable residents
Margaret Fairlie (1891-1963), academic and gynecologist, first woman to hold professorial chair in Scotland

See also
Carnoustie

References 

Villages in Angus, Scotland